Alessandro Profumo, current CEO of Leonardo S.p.A. (formerly Finmeccanica), is an Italian manager in banking. He worked as a consultant at McKinsey and Bain and, when CEO of Unicredit, he was involved in the merger with HypoVereinsbank, Bank Austria Creditanstalt and Capitalia with the UniCredit Group. He resigned as CEO of the Unicredit Group on 21 September 2010.

Early life and education
Alessandro Profumo was born in Genoa on 17 February 1957. The youngest of five children, he grew up in Palermo; in 1970, he moved to Milan with his parents, where he went to the Liceo Manzoni and met his future wife Sabina Ratti. His classmate. After finishing high school, Profumo enrolled at Bocconi University. 

Having to support a family, Profumo dropped out of university and started his professional career at Banco Lariano. In 1987, Profumo resumed his studies and obtained a degree in Business Economics.

Professional career
From 1998, when UniCredit Group arose from "Credito Italiano", Profumo has acted as its CEO. By December 2005 he was appointed chairman of the supervisory board of HVB. 

In April 2012, Profumo was appointed Chairman of Italian bank Banca Monte dei Paschi di Siena.

In March 2015, Profumo was acquitted in the Brontos case, an alleged tax fraud perpetrated by Unicredit managers with the support of Barclays managers. The judge closed the case because "the fact did not exist".  

In May 2017, the board of directors of Leonardo S.p.A. appointed Profumo as CEO of the group.

Honours
 2004: Knight of the Order of Merit for Labour ("Cavaliere al Merito del Lavoro") of the Italian Republic, by then president Carlo Azeglio Ciampi
 2019: Best CEO in the Defence Industry by Business Worldwide Magazine

Personal life
In 1977, Profumo married Sabina, and his only son Marco was born the same year.

References 

 

1957 births
Bocconi University alumni
Businesspeople from Genoa
Italian male writers
Living people
McKinsey & Company people
Italian people convicted of tax crimes
Harvard Business School people